Catoptria laevigatellus is a species of moth in the family Crambidae described by Julius Lederer. It is found in Bulgaria, the Caucasus, Dagestan, Transcaucasia, Armenia, north-eastern Turkey and Syria.

The wingspan is about 25 mm.

References

Moths described in 1870
Crambini
Moths of Europe
Moths of Asia